Upsilon Andromedae b (υ Andromedae b, abbreviated Upsilon And b, υ And b), formally named Saffar , is an extrasolar planet approximately 44 light-years away from the Sun in the constellation of Andromeda. The planet orbits the solar analog star, Upsilon Andromedae A, approximately every five days. Discovered in June 1996 by Geoffrey Marcy and R. Paul Butler, it was one of the first hot Jupiters to be discovered. It is also one of the first non-resolved planets to be detected directly. Upsilon Andromedae b is the innermost-known planet in its planetary system.

In July 2014 the International Astronomical Union launched NameExoWorlds, a process for giving proper names to certain exoplanets and their host stars. The process involved public nomination and voting for the new names. In December 2015, the IAU announced the winning name was Saffar for this planet. The winning name was submitted by the Vega Astronomy Club of Morocco and honours the 11th-century astronomer Ibn al-Saffar of Muslim Spain.

Discovery 
Upsilon Andromedae b was detected by the variations in its star's radial velocity caused by the planet's gravity. The variations were detected by making sensitive measurements of the Doppler shift of Upsilon Andromedae's spectrum. The planet's existence was announced in January 1997, together with 55 Cancri b and the planet orbiting Tau Boötis.

Like 51 Pegasi b, the first extrasolar planet discovered around a normal star, Upsilon Andromedae b orbits very close to its star, closer than Mercury does to the Sun. The planet takes 4.617 days to complete an orbit, with a semimajor axis of 0.0595 AU.

A limitation of the radial velocity method used to detect Upsilon Andromedae b is that only a lower limit on the mass can be found. The true mass may be much greater depending on the inclination of the orbit.

Physical characteristics 

Given the planet's high mass, it is likely that Upsilon Andromedae b is a gas giant with no solid surface.

The Spitzer Space Telescope measured the planet temperature, and found that the difference between the two sides of Upsilon Andromedae b of about 1,400 degrees Celsius, ranging from minus 20 to 230 degrees to about 1,400 to 1,650 °C. The temperature difference has led to speculation that Upsilon Andromedae b is tidal locked with the same side always facing Upsilon Andromedae A.

Sudarsky had, on the assumption that the planet is similar to Jupiter in composition and that its environment is close to chemical equilibrium, predicted Upsilon Andromedae b to have reflective clouds of silicates and iron in its upper atmosphere. The cloud deck instead absorbs the sun's radiation; between that and the hot, high-pressure gas surrounding the mantle, exists a stratosphere of cooler gas. The outer shell of dark, opaque, hot cloud is assumed to consist of vanadium and titanium oxides, but other compounds like tholins cannot be ruled out yet.

The chemical elements in the atmosphere can be studied by finding their absorption lines in the thermal spectrum of the planet; given typical planet temperatures, the spectrum has its peak at infrared wavelengths. So far, only water vapor has been detected in this planet, while carbon monoxide and methane are still under the detection limit.

The planet is unlikely to have large moons, since tidal forces would either eject them from orbit or destroy them on short timescales compared to the age of the system.

The planet (with 51 Pegasi b) was deemed a candidate for direct imaging by Planetpol. Preliminary results from polarimetric studies indicate that the planet has predominately blue color, is 1.36 times as large and 0.74 times as massive as Jupiter, meaning that the mean density is 0.36g/cm3. It has a geometric albedo of 0.35 in visible light. In 2016–2017 the direct detection of the planetary thermal emission was claimed, but the detection was questioned in 2021. Tidal heating models predict a similar mass for the planet.

Effect on the parent star 

Upsilon Andromedae b appears to be responsible for increased chromospheric activity on its parent star. Observations suggest that there is a "hot spot" on the star around 169° away from the sub-planetary point. This may be the result of interactions between the magnetic fields of the planet and the star. The mechanism may be similar to that responsible for the activity of RS Canum Venaticorum variable stars, or the interaction between Jupiter and its moon Io.

See also 
 55 Cancri b
 Tau Boötis b

References

External links 
 
 
 
 
 
 
 

Upsilon Andromedae
Exoplanets discovered in 1996
Giant planets
Hot Jupiters
Exoplanets detected by radial velocity
Exoplanets with proper names